The City of Kraków Award is an award bestowed annually by the President of Kraków, Poland, for contributions relating to the city, and the popularization of its culture at home and abroad. It is given to prominent artists in the field of theatre, music, plastic arts and film, as well as to scholars and athletes. The applications can be submitted by the city cultural committee itself, as well as by art colleges, unions of art professionals, cultural institutions and publishers.

Applications for an award cannot be submitted by individuals. Among the institutions eligible to submit them are universities, arts and cultural organizations, the City Council committees, and sports associations, depending on the nomination category in which they are requested.

Recipients
 Józef Baran
 Jan Błoński
 Leszek Długosz
 Jerzy Fedorowicz
 Józef Andrzej Gierowski
 Krzysztof Globisz
 Zygmunt Konieczny
 Stanisław Konturek
 Julian Kornhauser
 Robert Korzeniowski
 Mariusz Kwiecień
 Ewa Lipska
 Krzysztof Meyer
 Andrzej Mleczko
 Krystyna Moszumańska-Nazar
 Jan Nowicki
 Jerzy Nowosielski
 Wiesław Ochman
 Maria Pawlikowska-Jasnorzewska
 Krzysztof Penderecki
 Franciszek Pieczka
 Anna Polony
 Zbigniew Preisner
 Dorota Segda
 Marek Stachowski
 Jerzy Stuhr
 Anna Świrszczyńska
 Jerzy Trela
 Marcin Urbaś
 Jan Woleński
 Adam Zagajewski
 Maciej Żurawski
 Zdzisław Żygulski (art historian)

References

Polish awards
Kraków Award
Culture in Kraków